Kentucky supplemental roads and rural secondary highways are the lesser two of the four functional classes of highways constructed and maintained by the Kentucky Transportation Cabinet, the state-level agency that constructs and maintains highways in Kentucky. The agency splits its inventory of state highway mileage into four categories:
The State Primary System includes Interstate Highways, Parkways, and other long-distance highways of statewide importance that connect the state's major cities, including much of the courses of Kentucky's U.S. Highways.
The State Secondary System includes highways of regional importance that connect the state's smaller urban centers, including those county seats not served by the state primary system.
The Rural Secondary System includes highways of local importance, such as farm-to-market roads and urban collectors.
Supplemental Roads are the set of highways not in the first three systems, including frontage roads, bypassed portions of other state highways, and rural roads that only serve their immediate area.

The same-numbered highway can comprise sections of road under different categories. This list contains descriptions of Supplemental Roads and highways in the Rural Secondary System numbered 500 to 599 that do not have portions within the State Primary and State Secondary systems.



Kentucky Route 501

Kentucky Route 501 (KY 501) is a  state highway that runs from Kentucky Route 910 at Phil to U.S. Route 27 northeast of Kings Mountain via Kings Mountain.

Major intersections

Kentucky Route 502

Kentucky Route 502 (KY 502) is a  state highway in Hopkins County that runs from Kentucky Route 109 and Bone Road at Rabbit Ridge to Old Morganfield Road and Balls Hill Road north of Nebo via Nebo.

Major intersections

Kentucky Route 503

Kentucky Route 503 (KY 503) is a  state highway that runs from Kentucky Route 5 north of Princess to Kentucky Route 3105 and Industrial Road in Wurtland via Naples and Danleyton.

Major intersections

Kentucky Route 504

Kentucky Route 504 (KY 504) is a  state highway that runs from Kentucky Route 32 just east of Elliottville to Kentucky Route 7 at Green via Ault and Gimlet.

Major intersections

Kentucky Route 505

Kentucky Route 505 (KY 505) is a  rural secondary highway in eastern Ohio County. The highway extends from US 231 southeast of Cromwell north to KY 878 at Olaton via Oak Grove, Select, Baizetown, and Windy Hill. KY 505 begins at US 231 southeast of Cromwell. The highway heads northeast, bridges the West Prong of Indian Camp Creek, and crosses over the William H. Natcher Parkway. The highway gradually curves east as it crosses three branches of Indian Camp Creek and passes through Oak Grove and Select. At Baizetown, KY 505 meets the northern end of KY 1118 and turns north. The highway crosses the Western Kentucky Parkway on its way to Windy Hill, where the route meets the western end of KY 2713. KY 505 crosses over the Paducah and Louisville Railway shortly before its junction with US 62 east of Rosine. The two highway run concurrently east until KY 505 splits north near Horse Branch. KY 505 continues along Dan Road, which crosses Muddy Creek and a branch of Caney Creek before reaching its northern terminus at KY 878 at Olaton.

Major intersections

Kentucky Route 506

Kentucky Route 506 (KY 506) is a  state highway that runs from Kentucky Route 902 northeast of Enon to U.S. Route 60, Kentucky Route 91, and West Depot Street in downtown Marion via Piney Fork.

Major intersections

Kentucky Route 507

Kentucky Route 507 (KY 507) is a  rural secondary highway in eastern Christian County and northern Todd County. The highway extends from KY 107 in Hopkinsville east to KY 106 and KY 178 at Claymour via Allegre. KY 507 begins at a three-way intersection with KY 107 in the city of Hopkinsville. KY 107 heads west along East Seventh Street and northeast along Greenville Road, and KY 507 heads east along East Seventh Street. Further east, KY 507 splits northeast along Butler Road while KY 1979 continues along East Seventh Street to US 68 and KY 80. KY 507 heads northeast and meets the western end of KY 508, which continues on Butler Road while KY 507 continues on Pilot Rock Road. The route twice crosses Lower Branch of the North Fork of the Little River on its way to Pleasant Hill.

KY 507 crosses the South Fork of the Little River before crossing the Christian–Todd county line. The highway continues east and meets the eastern end of KY 189 (Moss Road) just west of the route's bridge across Buck Fork Creek. KY 507 crosses the Shelton Branch of the Pond River just west of Allegre, where the route intersects KY 171 (Allegre Road). The highway continues along Highland Lick Road, which crosses the Pond River and intersects KY 181 (Greenville Road) south of Cedar Grove. KY 507 continues southeast to Claymour, the site of the route's terminus at a four-way intersection with KY 106 (Sharon Grove Road) and KY 178, which takes over the course of Highland Lick Road.

Major intersections

Kentucky Route 508

Kentucky Route 508 (KY 508) is a  rural secondary highway in eastern Christian County and western Todd County. The highway begins at KY 507 east of Hopkinsville. KY 507 heads west along Butler Road and northeast along Pilot Rock Road; KY 508 heads southeast along Butler Road, which veers east at its junction with KY 1716 (Overby Lane). The highway crosses the South Fork of the Little River just west of its junction with KY 1843 (Vaughns Grove Fairview Road). KY 508 passes through Honey Grove before crossing the Christian–Todd county line. The highway follows Butler Road through Britmart to Tabernacle. From there, KY 508 follows Liberty–Britmart Road to its east end at Liberty.

Major intersections

Kentucky Route 509

Kentucky Route 509 (KY 509) is a  rural secondary highway in northwestern Nelson County. The highway begins at KY 245 (New Shepherdsville Road) south of Samuels. KY 509 heads north along Samuels Loop to Samuels, where the route meets the eastern end of KY 3207, also part of Samuels Loop, and has a grade crossing of an R.J. Corman Railroad Group rail line where it turns east onto Samuels Road. KY 509 heads northeast along Samuels Creek to its mouth at Froman Creek and crosses the latter creek, where the route continues east to Coxs Creek. There, the highway meets the southern end of KY 2739 (Lenore Road) and intersects US 31E and US 150 (Louisville Road). KY 509 continues east as Fairfield Road, which crosses Cox Creek and reaches its eastern terminus at KY 48 (Highgrove Road) west of the city of Fairfield.

Major intersections

Kentucky Route 510

Kentucky Route 510 (KY 510) is a  state highway that runs from Kentucky Route 221 at Pine Mountain to Kentucky Route 463 north of Gordon via Gilley.

Major intersections

Kentucky Route 511

Kentucky Route 511 (KY 511) is a  state highway that runs from U.S. Route 25W east of Youngs Creek to Kentucky Route 26 and Youngs Lane at Rockholds via Walden.

Major intersections

Kentucky Route 512

Kentucky Route 512 (KY 512) is a  state highway that runs from Kentucky Route 395 at Birdie to U.S. Route 127 east of Alton via Alton Station and Alton.

Major intersections

Kentucky Route 513

Kentucky Route 513 (KY 513) is a  state highway that runs from U.S. Route 62 at Fox Creek to Harry Wise Road and Gilberts Creek Road east of McBrayer via McBrayer.

Major intersections

Kentucky Route 514

Kentucky Route 514 (KY 514) is a  state highway in Caldwell County that runs from Ferguson Road at the Caldwell-Lyon County line west of Hopson to Kentucky Routes 126 and 128 northwest of Cobb via Hopson.

Major intersections

Kentucky Route 515

Kentucky Route 515 (KY 515) is a  state highway in Caldwell County that runs from Kentucky Route 903 to Kentucky Route 139 south-southeast of Princeton.

Kentucky Route 516

Kentucky Route 516 (KY 516) is a  state highway in Bell County.

Kentucky Route 517

Kentucky Route 517 (KY 517) is a  state highway in Allen County that runs from Kentucky Route 252 to Bailey Point Road and Hix Road northeast of Cedar Springs along the shore of Barren River Lake.

Kentucky Route 520

Kentucky Route 520 (KY 520) is a  state highway in Henderson County that runs from Kentucky Route 136 southeast of Anthoston to Kentucky Route 416 and Upper Delaware Road at Coraville.

Kentucky Route 521

Kentucky Route 521 (KY 521) is a  state highway in Laurel County that runs from Kentucky Route 1189 southwest of Lesbas to Kentucky Route 80 southwest of Brock.

Major intersections

Kentucky Route 522

Kentucky Route 522 (KY 522) is a  state highway in Harlan County that runs from U.S. Route 119 and Ross Drive in Rosspoint to Kentucky Route 160 at Sand Hill via Rosspoint, Rhea, Dillon, Laden, Nolansburg, Totz, Dione, Hiram, and Chad. It is the original alignment of US 119.

Major intersections

Kentucky Route 523

Kentucky Route 523 (KY 523) is a  state highway in Nelson County that runs from Kentucky Route 245 and Marr Lane southeast of Deatsville and going through Deatsville and Lenore.  KY 523 was extended on its eastern end upon the completion of a realigned section of Louisville Road (US 31E / US 150).  KY 523 now follows the former alignment of Louisville Road from its former terminus 2 miles south of High Grove northward for approximately 4½ miles to the new Louisville Road.  That is south of the Salt River bridge at the border between Spencer County and Bullitt County.  The new section also includes a 1½ mile concurrency with Kentucky Route 48, which was also slightly extended to meet up the newer incarnation of US 31E / US 150

Kentucky Route 524

Kentucky Route 524 (KY 524) is a  state highway in Oldham County that runs from and to U.S. Route 42 via Westport.

Major intersections

Kentucky Route 525

Kentucky Route 525 (KY 525) is a  state highway in Trigg County that runs from Kentucky Route 164 west of Roaring Spring to Kentucky Route 139 south of Cadiz.

Major intersections

Kentucky Route 529

Kentucky Route 529 (KY 529) is a  state highway in Washington County that runs from Valley Hill Road and Croakes Station Road at Booker to Kentucky Route 55 west of Mooresville.

Kentucky Route 530

Kentucky Route 530 (KY 530) is a  state highway in Adair County that runs from Kentucky Route 55 and Keltner Road to Kentucky Route 2971 north of Columbia.

Kentucky Route 531

Kentucky Route 531 (KY 531) is a  state highway in Adair County that runs from Kentucky Route 80 east of Ozark to Kentucky Route 206 at Christine via Craycraft.

Major intersections

Kentucky Route 532

Kentucky Route 532 (KY 532) is a  state highway in Adair County that runs from New Cedar Grove Road at the Green County line to Kentucky Route 61 southwest of Hatcher.

Kentucky Route 533

Kentucky Route 533 (KY 533) is a  state highway in that runs from Kentucky Route 496 southeast of Edmonton to Independence Ridge Road and Pelston Cemetery Road east of Breeding via Cofer and Breeding.

Major intersections

Kentucky Route 534

Kentucky Route 534 (KY 534) is a  state highway in Graves County that runs from Kentucky Route 408 and Wayne Freeman Road northeast of Clear Springs to Kentucky Route 348 in southeastern Symsonia.

Major intersections

Kentucky Route 535

Kentucky Route 535 (KY 535) is a  state highway in Fonde, Bell County that runs from Kentucky Route 74 to a dead end.

Kentucky Route 537

Kentucky Route 537 (KY 537) is a  state highway that runs from U.S. Route 460 east of Paris to U.S. Route 60 east of Stoops via Cane Ridge, Little Rock, Plum, Bunker Hill, Judy, and Stoops.

Major intersections

Kentucky Route 539

Kentucky Route 539 (KY 539) is a  state highway that runs from U.S. Route 62 west of Mount Olivet to Kentucky Route 22 east of Neave via Bratton, Santa Fe, and Milford.

Major intersections

Kentucky Route 540

Kentucky Route 540 (KY 540) is a  state highway in Breathitt County that runs from Kentucky Route 1812 northwest of Keck to Steel Fork Road and Strong Fork Road southeast of Taulbee.

Major intersections

Kentucky Route 541

Kentucky Route 541 (KY 541) is a  state highway in Breathitt County that runs from Kentucky Route 52 northwest of Chenowee to Kentucky Route 205 northwest of Fivemile via War Creek and Lawson.

Major intersections

Kentucky Route 542

Kentucky Route 542 (KY 542) is a  state highway that runs from Kentucky Route 30 southeast of Gage to Kentucky Route 7 southeast of Fredville via Lunah, Lambric, Evanston, and Waldo.

Major intersections

Kentucky Route 543

Kentucky Route 543 (KY 543) is a  state highway in Metcalfe County that runs from Kentucky Route 1243 and Smith Cemetery Road at Clarks Corner to U.S. Route 68 southeast of Beechville.

Major intersections

Kentucky Route 544

Kentucky Route 544 (KY 544) is a  state highway in Metcalfe County that runs from U.S. Route 68 west of Cork to a point on Bridgeport Road immediately east of a bridge across the East Fork of the Little Barren River via Cork.

Major intersections

Kentucky Route 545

Kentucky Route 545 (KY 545) is a  state highway in Carlisle County that runs from Kentucky Route 408 and Blinco Road northeast of Kirbyton to Kentucky Route 849 southeast of Cunningham.

Kentucky Route 548

Kentucky Route 548 (KY 548) is a  state highway in Carlisle County that runs from Kentucky Route 307 north of Kirbyton to Blinco Road northeast of Kirbyton.

Kentucky Route 549

Kentucky Route 549 (KY 549) is a  state highway in Carroll County that runs from Kentucky Route 55 and Vories Road northwest of Mill Creek to Kentucky Route 55 again southwest of Prestonville.

Major intersections

Kentucky Route 551

Kentucky Route 551 (KY 551) is a  state highway that runs from Kentucky Route 55 in far northern Columbia to Kentucky Route 1615 northeast of Clementsville via Absher.

Major intersections

Kentucky Route 552

Kentucky Route 552 (KY 552) is a  state highway in Laurel County that runs from Kentucky Route 192 northeast of Hightop to U.S. Route 25 and Slate Ridge Road northeast of Lily via Lily.

Major intersections

Kentucky Route 553

Kentucky Route 553 (KY 553) is a  state highway in Clinton County that runs from a boat dock on the shore of Dale Hollow Lake west of Shipley to southbound U.S. Route 127 Business  in southern Albany.

Major intersections

Kentucky Route 554

Kentucky Route 554 (KY 554) is a  state highway that runs from Kentucky Route 815 north of Guffie to U.S. Route 431 south of Pettit via Panther and Tuck.

Major intersections

Kentucky Route 557

Kentucky Route 557 (KY 557) is a  state highway in Elliott County that runs from Kentucky Route 556 to Kentucky Routes 7 and 32 north of Sandy Hook.

Kentucky Route 558

Kentucky Route 558 (KY 558) is a  state highway that runs from U.S. Route 127 and Old Bypassed US 127 Segment 7 Connector south of Snow to a boat dock on Lake Cumberland southeast of Rowena via Marlow, Cumberland City, and Watauga.

Kentucky Route 559

Kentucky Route 559 (KY 559) is a  state highway that runs from Kentucky Route 170 northeast of Nepton to Kentucky Route 344 at Petersville via Flemingsburg and Wallingford.

Kentucky Route 560

Kentucky Route 560 (KY 560) is a  state highway that runs from Kentucky Route 32 east of Cowan to U.S. Route 68 and East Bolden Lane southwest of Mays Lick via Ewing.

Kentucky Route 561

Kentucky Route 561 (KY 561) is a  state highway that runs from U.S. Route 421 northwest of Flag Fork to Kentucky River Lock and Dam No. 3 and Fallis-Gest Road at Gest via Orville.

Major intersections

Kentucky Route 562

Kentucky Route 562 (KY 562) is a  state highway in Gallatin County that runs from Kentucky Route 16 to U.S. Routes 42 and 127 northeast of Napoleon.

Major intersections

Kentucky Route 563

Kentucky Route 563 (KY 563) is a  state highway in Garrard County that runs from Kentucky Route 1295 northeast of Hyattsville to Kentucky Route 39 and Buckeye Road northeast of Stone.

Major intersections

Kentucky Route 564

Kentucky Route 564 (KY 564) is a  state highway in Graves County that runs from Kentucky Route 94 east of Tri City to Kentucky Route 58 southeast of Hicksville via Cooksville, Farmington, and Golo.

Major intersections

Kentucky Route 565

Kentucky Route 565 (KY 565) is a  state highway that runs from Kentucky Route 61 northwest of Gresham to Kentucky Route 55 south of Romine.

Major intersections

Kentucky Route 566

Kentucky Route 566 (KY 566) is a  state highway that runs from U.S. Route 31E at Linwood to Kentucky Route 61 northwest of Allendale via Eve and Hudgins.

Major intersections

Kentucky Route 567

Kentucky Route 567 (KY 567) is a  state highway in Hardin County that runs from Kentucky Route 210 in far southeastern Elizabethtown to the Larue County line northwest of Roanoke.

Major intersections

Kentucky Route 568

Kentucky Route 568 (KY 568) is a  state highway in Harlan County that runs from U.S. Route 421 at Cranks to Rhymer Hicks Cemetery Lane northeast of Cranks.

Major intersections

Kentucky Route 569

Kentucky Route 569 (KY 569) is a  state highway that runs from Kentucky Route 357 west of Hinesdale to Kentucky Route 210 northeast of Mac via Hinesdale, Hudgins, Lobb, Bloyds Crossing, Coakley, and Mac.

Major intersections

Kentucky Route 570

Kentucky Route 570 (KY 570) is a  state highway in Hart County that runs from Kentucky Routes 218 and 436 at LeGrande to Kentucky Route 88 southeast of Hardyville via Rex.

Major intersections

Kentucky Route 571

Kentucky Route 571 (KY 571) is a  state highway  that runs from Kentucky Route 740 southeast of Park to U.S. Route 31W in Woodsonville via Seymour and Uno.

Major intersections

Kentucky Route 572

Kentucky Route 572 (KY 572) is a  state highway in Hart County that runs from Kentucky Route 571 northwest of Seymour to Kentucky Route 218 southwest of LeGrande.

Kentucky Route 573

Kentucky Route 573 (KY 573) is a  state highway in Henry County that runs from U.S Route 421 and Kentucky Routes 55 and 146 in downtown New Castle to Kentucky Route 561 north of Flag Fork via Point Pleasant and Bethlehem.

Major intersections

Kentucky Route 574

Kentucky Route 574 (KY 574) is a  state highway in Henry County that runs from U.S Route 421 and Kentucky Route 55 on the eastern Campbellsburg city line to Kentucky Route 389 southeast of Port Royal via Turners Station.

Major intersections

Kentucky Route 575

Kentucky Route 575 (KY 575) is a  state highway in Hickman County that runs from Kentucky Route 58 west of Fulgham to Kentucky Route 123 west of Nichols.

Major intersections

Kentucky Route 576

Kentucky Route 576 (KY 576) is a  state highway in Mason County that runs from Kentucky Route 3056 west of Moranburg to Kentucky Route 8 at South Ripley.

Major intersections

Kentucky Route 577

Kentucky Route 577 (KY 577) is a  state highway that runs from Kentucky Route 3630 southeast of Peoples to Kentucky Route 11 east of Taft via Moores Creek, High Knob, Sextons Creek, and Taft.

Major intersections

Kentucky Route 578

Kentucky Route 578 (KY 578) is a  state highway that runs from Kentucky Route 490 at Victory to Kentucky Route 290 and Wiley Hillard Road on the northwestern edge of Annville via McWhorter, Royrader, Green Hill, and Annville.

Major intersections

Kentucky Route 580

Kentucky Route 580 (KY 580) is a  state highway that runs from Kentucky Route 490 in Johnson County that runs from U.S. Route 460 southeast of Oil Springs to Kentucky Route 40 at Barnetts Creek via Oil Springs and Manilla.

Major intersections

Kentucky Route 583

Kentucky Route 583 (KY 583) is a  state highway that runs from Kentucky Route 52 northwest of Lyons to U.S. Route 62 and Kentucky Route 61 at Younger Creek.

Major intersections

Kentucky Route 584

Kentucky Route 584 (KY 584) is a  state highway in Larue County that runs from Kentucky Route 61 southwest of South Buffalo to Kentucky Route 210 immediately north of Jericho via Jericho.

Major intersections

Kentucky Route 585

Kentucky Route 585 (KY 585) is a  rural secondary highway in eastern Simpson County and western Allen County. The highway extends from Kentucky Route 73 in Franklin east to Kentucky Route 100 west of Scottsville via Gold City, Mount Aerial, and Red Hill.

Route description 
KY 585 begins at KY 73 at the east city limit of Franklin; the latter highway heads west into town along Cedar Street and southeast along Rapids Road, which intersects KY 100 (Scottsville Road) just south of KY 585's terminus. KY 585 heads east along Gold City Road, which crosses over I-65 with no access and traverses Lick Creek, a tributary of the West Fork of Drakes Creek. The highway has junctions with KY 622 west of and at Gold City, the former as Hickory Flat–Gold City Road and the latter as Temperance Road. KY 585 crosses the Middle Fork of Drakes Creek at the Simpson–Allen county line. The highway continues as Old Franklin Road, which passes through Mount Aerial and crosses Hams Branch west of the route's junction with KY 1332 (Pope Road). KY 585 crosses Johns Creek and Trammel Creek on either side of Red Hill. The highway reaches its eastern terminus at KY 100 (Franklin Road) west of Scottsville. The Kentucky Transportation Cabinet assigned KY 585 as a redesignation of KY 265 through a pair of September 29, 1988, official orders.

Major intersections

Kentucky Route 586

Kentucky Route 586 (KY 586) is a  state highway in Laurel County that runs from Kentucky Route 472 to Kentucky Route 638 around and through Maplesville.

Major intersections

Kentucky Route 589

Kentucky Route 589 (KY 589) is a  state highway in Morgan County that runs from Kentucky Route 172 southwest of Elkfork to Kentucky Route 437 north of Mima via Middle Fork.

Major intersections

Kentucky Route 590

Kentucky Route 590 (KY 590) is a  state highway that runs from U.S. Route 27 and Bass Avenue in northeastern Stanford to Kentucky Route 52 at Hedgeville via Hubble.

Major intersections

Kentucky Route 591

Kentucky Route 591 (KY 591) is a  state highway that runs from Kentucky Route 96 north of Schley to Kentucky Route 383 west of Providence via Schley, Adairville, and Prices Mill.

Major intersections

Kentucky Route 592

Kentucky Route 592 (KY 592) is a  state highway in McCreary County that runs to and from Kentucky Route 92 east of Pine Knot.

Major intersections

Kentucky Route 593

Kentucky Route 593 (KY 593) is a  state highway in McCreary County that runs from Kentucky Route 56 south of Comer to Kentucky Route 136 and Porter School Road east of Beech Grove via Comer, Elba, and Wyman.

Major intersections

Kentucky Route 594

Kentucky Route 594 (KY 594) is a  state highway that runs from U.S. Route 421 north of Bighill to Kentucky Route 52 west of Irvine via Duluth and Jinks.

Major intersections

Kentucky Route 596

Kentucky Route 596 (KY 596) is a  state highway that runs from U.S. Route 62 at Shannon to Kentucky Route 10 in eastern Germantown.

Major intersections

Kentucky Route 597

Kentucky Route 597 (KY 597) is a  state highway that runs from Kentucky Route 11 Business in northern Flemingsburg to Kentucky Route 11 southeast of Marshall via Mount Gilead.

Major intersections

Kentucky Route 598

Kentucky Route 598 (KY 598) is a  state highway in Mercer County that runs from Kentucky Route 1915 to U.S. Route 127 south of Harrodsburg.

Kentucky Route 599

Kentucky Route 599 (KY 599) is a  state highway that runs from Kentucky Route 613 north of Bowen to U.S. Route 460 in downtown Jeffersonville.

Major intersections

References

State highways in Kentucky
Lists of roads in Kentucky